Mariya Shkolna (born 28 October 1997 in Kyiv, Ukraine) is a Ukrainian athlete who competes in compound archery. She started archery in 2009 and first competed for the Ukrainian national team in 2010. She is righthanded. Her draw weight is 59 lbs.

She is the member of the Ukrainian women's team that won the first ever medal in compound archery and the first ever gold medal overall for Ukraine at World Archery Championships in 2015.

References

Living people
1997 births
Sportspeople from Kyiv
Ukrainian female archers
World Archery Championships medalists
21st-century Ukrainian women